Mohammad Haider Zhobal (born in Kabul, Afghanistan, d. 1959) was an Afghan historian and scholar.

Author career
Zhobal was raised in Kabul, Afghanistan. 

In 1958, he defied Afghan government's censorship by publicly praising the role of Mahmud Tarzi in the country's history.

Selected publications

Essays 
 About Zulf and Zulfeen (1954)
 The Influx of Foreign Words and Expressions in Our Language (1956)

Books 
 Uṣūl-i jadīd-i tadrīs-i zabān-i Fārsī ("On modern teaching techniques of Persian language", 1960s)
 Tārīkh-i adabīyāt-i Afghānistān ("History of the literatures of Afghanistan", 1957/1958)

Further reading

References

External links
 Zhobels books at acku-koha.osslabs.biz

20th-century Afghan historians
Living people
Year of birth missing (living people)
21st-century Afghan historians
20th-century male writers
21st-century male writers
Afghan male writers
People from Kabul